Bonnet Over the Windmill is a 1937 play by the British writer Dodie Smith. Its original West End run at the New Theatre lasted for 101 performances between September and December 1937. The original cast included James Mason, Cecil Parker, Peter Coke and Anne Firth.

References

Bibliography
 Wearing, J. P. The London Stage 1930–1939: A Calendar of Productions, Performers, and Personnel.  Rowman & Littlefield, 2014.

1937 plays
Plays by Dodie Smith
Plays set in England
West End plays
Hodder & Stoughton books